The 1997 Liverpool Victoria UK Championship was a professional ranking snooker tournament that took place at the Guild Hall in Preston, England. The event started on 12 November 1997 and the televised stages were shown on BBC between 22 and 30 November 1997. This was the last UK championship to be held in Preston, where the event was  held since 1978. The following year's competition was held in Bournemouth.

Ronnie O'Sullivan defeated Stephen Hendry 10–6 in the final, ending Hendry's run of three successive UK championship wins. O'Sullivan had been the last player other than Hendry to win the event, as a 17-year-old in 1993. The highest TV break of the competition was 137 made by Stephen Lee and it was worth £5,000.

Main draw

Final

Qualifying

1st Round  Best of 11 frames

 John Read 6–3 Michael Judge 

 Sean Storey 6–1 Euan Henderson 

 Jamie Burnett 6–1 Craig MacGillivray 

 Troy Shaw 6–4 Dave Finbow 

 Tony Jones 6–3 John Lardner 

 Paul Davies 6–4 Steve Judd 

 Jason Prince 6–4 Matthew Couch 

 David Gray 6–5 Graeme Dott 

 Quinten Hann 6–3 Joe Johnson 

 Martin Dziewialtowski 6–3 Anthony Davies 

 Dean Reynolds 6–3 Stephen O'Connor 

 Shokat Ali 6–4 Karl Payne 

 Ian McCulloch 6–5 Jason Ferguson 

 Matthew Stevens 6–3 Jamie Woodman 

 Dennis Taylor 6–2 Wayne Brown 

 Jonathan Birch 6–0 Mark Gray 

 Gary Ponting 6–4 Nick Pearce 

 Dene O'Kane 6–2 Stuart Pettman 

 Lee Richardson 6–5 Stefan Mazrocis 

 Gerard Greene 6–5 Ian Brumby 

 Wayne Jones 6–4 Leigh Griffin 

 Willie Thorne 6–2 Peter McCullagh 

 Chris Scanlon 6–4 Joe Perry 

 Marcus Campbell 6–5 Tony Chappel 

 Paul Wykes 6–5 Mark Davis 

 Peter Lines 6–5 Jimmy Michie 

 Bradley Jones 6–5 Drew Henry 

 Dominic Dale 6–5 Alfie Burden 

 Paul Hunter 6–3 Nick Walker 

 Mark Bennett 6–4 Darren Clarke 

 Karl Burrows 6–4 David Roe 

 Karl Broughton 6–2 Lee Walker

Century breaks

 143, 121, 120, 105, 100  Matthew Stevens
 138, 129, 119, 115  Anthony Hamilton
 137, 121, 119, 115  Stephen Lee
 136  Jamie Burnett
 134, 115  Peter Ebdon
 131  David Gray
 130, 126, 113, 107  Alan McManus
 130, 100, 100  Quinten Hann
 130  Dean Reynolds
 124, 113, 105  Ronnie O'Sullivan
 124  Mark Bennett
 122  Peter Lines
 119, 116, 110, 108  Darren Morgan
 119  Andy Hicks
 116, 114  Bradley Jones
 116  Stuart Pettman
 115  Mark Williams
 113, 100  Ian McCulloch
 112, 111  Karl Burrows
 108, 106, 105, 101  Martin Dziewialtowski
 108  Tony Chappel
 107  Rod Lawler
 106  Drew Henry
 105  Stephen Hendry
 104  Jason Prince
 103  Shokat Ali
 103  Stephen O'Connor
 102  John Higgins
 102  Gary Wilkinson
 100  Mick Price
 100  Marcus Campbell
 100  Dene O'Kane

References

1997
UK Championship
UK Championship
UK Championship, 2004
1990s in Lancashire
November 1997 sports events in the United Kingdom